"Trainwreck of Emotion" is a song written by Jon Vezner and Alan Rhody, and recorded by American country music artist Lorrie Morgan.  It was released in December 1988 as the first single from the album Leave the Light On.  The song reached #20 on the Billboard Hot Country Singles & Tracks chart.

Chart performance

References

1989 singles
Lorrie Morgan songs
Songs written by Jon Vezner
Song recordings produced by Barry Beckett
RCA Records singles
1989 songs